Headlok is a fictional character appearing in American comic books published by Marvel Comics. The character first appeared in The West Coast Avengers vol. 2 #10 in July 1986.

Publication history
Headlok first appeared in The West Coast Avengers vol. 2 #10 (July 1986), and was created by Steve Englehart and Al Milgrom.

The character subsequently appears in Alpha Flight #93-96 (Feb.–May 1991), #102-104 (Nov. 1991-Jan. 1992) and Thunderbolts #55-58 (Oct. 2001-Jan. 2002).

Headlok received an entry in the Official Handbook of the Marvel Universe Update '89 #3.

Fictional character biography
This mysterious menace found the Griffin roaming the Adirondack Mountains, and used his mental powers to enslave the Griffin. Headlok tricked the West Coast Avengers by claiming to have spotted Ben Grimm whom the team was looking for. Headlok ambushed them with the Griffin and attempted to take over their minds one by one. The Avenger Tigra was able to calm the Griffin's rage. It turns out the Thing had indeed been nearby and he joined the battle. Headlok, not knowing this, had not been using his powers to hide himself from sight or mentally influence Ben Grimm and thus was taken by surprise and Headlok was swiftly defeated.

Alpha Flight and the Fantastic Four later contended against Headlok. Headlok mentally manipulated Aurora, causing her to revert to her original split personality, and she then apparently killed Headlok. However, he later reappeared as a prisoner, and participated in a prison break.

Headlok has since been seen working for S.H.I.E.L.D. alongside Bennet Du Paris. They were brought in to deal with a rogue mutant as part of S.H.I.E.L.D.'s Psi-division. The psychic confrontation appears to have left Headlok dead. This death is eventually undone when Cyclops' former student, Tempus, goes back in time to erase a rogue mutant's existence.

Powers and abilities
Headlok can psionically control or influence the minds of other beings. He can mentally enslave people or alter their perception, such as making them believe he is standing in an area he is not actually in.

Sufficient concentration and willpower allows an individual to see through this illusion. If the intended victim knows Headlok plans to use his enslaving ability, his power can be resisted.

Mind Control: Headlok possesses the ability to control minds. He can mentally enslave only one individual at a time, as such domination requires a large amount of concentration on Headlok's part. Headlok can induce hallucinations and cast illusions against an unlimited number of targets as long as he has already gained control of their minds. Victims who are aware of Headlok's power were more likely to break his hold.

References

External links
 

Characters created by Al Milgrom
Comics characters introduced in 1986
Marvel Comics supervillains
Marvel Comics telepaths